The 1895 Michigan State Normal Normalites football team represented Michigan State Normal School (later renamed Eastern Michigan University) during the 1895 college football season.  In their first and only season under head coach Marcus Cutler, the Normalites compiled a record of 3–3, and outscored by their opponents by a combined total of 119 to 54. Benjamin J. Watters was the team captain.

Schedule

References

Michigan State Normal
Eastern Michigan Eagles football seasons
Michigan State Normal Normalites football